Shirvanshah Afridun II the Lionheart was the twentieth independent Shah of Shirvan.

Reign and death
He reigned for a very short period of time. He was killed by an anonymous archer same year. He left no numismatic evidence but known from his son Shirvanshah Fariburz II's coins.

References

12th-century Iranian people